This is a list of statutory boards controlled by the central government of Sri Lanka.

Universities
 Buddhasravaka Bhikku University
 Buddhist and Pali University of Sri Lanka
 Eastern University, Sri Lanka
 General Sir John Kotelawala Defence University
 Open University of Sri Lanka
 Rajarata University of Sri Lanka
 Sabaragamuwa University of Sri Lanka
 South Eastern University of Sri Lanka
 University of Colombo
 University of Jaffna
 University of Kelaniya
 University of Moratuwa
 University of Peradeniya
 University of Ruhuna
 University of Sri Jayewardenepura
 Wayamba University of Sri Lanka

Hospitals
 Angoda Mental Hospital
 Ayurveda Teaching Hospital, Borella
 Cancer Hospital, Maharagama
 Castle Street Hospital for Women
 Chest Hospital, Welisara
 Colombo North General Hospital, Ragama
 De Zoysa Hospital for Women
 Eye Hospital, Colombo
 General Hospital, Colombo South
 Homeopathy Hospital, Welisara
 Jaffna Teaching Hospital
 Kandy General Hospital
 Karapitiya Teaching Hospital
 Kegalle General Hospital
 Lady Ridgeway Hospital for Children
 Mahamodara General Hospital
 Peradeniya Teaching Hospital
 Sri Jayawardenapura General Hospital

Other
 Arthur C. Clarke Institute for Modern Technologies
 Atomic Energy Authority
 Ayurvedic Medical Council
 Board of Investment of Sri Lanka
 Central Cultural Fund
 Central Environmental Authority
 Central Freight Bureau of Sri Lanka
 Ceylon Fishery Harbours Corporation
 Clothing Industry Training Institute
 Coconut Cultivation Board
 Coconut Development Authority
 Coconut Research Board
 Common Amenities Board
 Council for Information Technology (CINTEC)
 Energy Conservation Fund
 Fair Trading Commission
 Gamphaha Wickramarachchi Ayurveda Institute
 Gem & Jewellery Research and Training Institute 
 Geological Survey & Mines Bureau
 Hadabima Authority of Sri Lanka
 Hector Kobbkduwa Agrarian Research & Training Institute
 Human Rights Commission of Sri Lanka
 Industrial Development Board
 Industrial Technology Institute (CISIR)
 Institute of Aesthetic Studies
 Institute of Construction, Training & Development (ICTAD)
 Institute of Indigenous Medicine (IIM)
 Institute of Policy Studies
 Institute of Post Harvest Technology
 Institute of Survey & Mapping
 Institute of Technology, University of Moratuwa
 Institute of Workers' Education
 Insurance Board of Sri Lanka
 Land Reform Commission 
 Mahaweli Authority of Sri Lanka
 Marine Pollution Prevention Authority
 National Apprenticeship & Industrial Training Authority
 National Aquaculture Development Authority
 National Aquatic Resources & Development Agency	
 National Authority on Teachers' Education
 National Building Research Organisation
 National Child Protection Authority
 National Crafts Council
 National Dangerous Drugs Control Board
 National Engineering, Research & Development Centre of Sri Lanka
 National Gem & Jewellery Authority
 National Housing Development Authority
 National Human Resources Development Council of Sri Lanka
 National Institute of Corporative Development 
 National Institute of Education
 National Institute of Fundamental Studies (NIFS)
 National Institute of Fisheries and Nautical Engineering
 National Institute of Library & Information Sciences (NILIS)
 National Institute of Plantation Management 
 National Institute of Social Development
 National Institute of Technical Education
 National Science & Technology Commission
 National Science Foundation
 National Transport Commission
 National Youth Services Council
 Official Languages Commission
 Palmyrah Development Board
 Post Graduate Institute of Agriculture
 Post Graduate Institute of Archaeology
 Post Graduate Institute of Management
 Post Graduate Institute of Medicine
 Post Graduate Institute of Pali & Buddhist Studies
 Post Graduate Institute of Science
 Public Enterprises Reform Commission
 Rana Viru Seva Authority
 Rehabilitation of Persons, Properties and Industries Authority
 Road Development Authority
 Rubber Research Institute of Sri Lanka
 Samurdhi Authority of Sri Lanka
 Securities & Exchange Commission of Sri Lanka
 Southern Development Authority of Sri Lanka	
 Sri Lanka Accounting & Auditing Standard Monitoring Board
 Sri Lanka Council for Agricultural Research Policy
 Sri Lanka Export Development Board
 Sri Lanka Foundation Institute
 Sri Lanka Institute of Advance Technical Education
 Sri Lanka Institute of Development Administration
 Sri Lanka Institute of Local Governance
 Sri Lanka Institute of Printing
 Sri Lanka Inventors' Commission
 Sri Lanka National Designs Centre
 Sri Lanka National Library & Documentation Services Board
 Sri Lanka Press Council
 Sri Lanka Social Security Board
 Sri Lanka Standards Institution
 Sri Lanka Tea Board
 Sri Lanka Tourist Board
 Sugarcane Research Institute
 Sugathadassa National Sports Complex Authority
 Superior Court Complex Board of Management
 Tea Research Board
 Tea Small Holdings Development Authority
 Telecommunication Regulatory Commission of Sri Lanka
 Tertiary and Vocational Education Commission
 Textile Quota Board
 Textile Training & Services Centre
 Tower Hall Theater Foundation
 University Grants Commission 
 University of Colombo School of Computing
 Vijaya Kumaratunga Hospital
 Vocational Training Authority of Sri Lanka
 Water Resources Board

See also
 List of government owned companies in Sri Lanka

References
 

Statutory Boards